Mexican Open may refer to:

 Mexican Open (golf), the national golf tournament held in various locales in Mexico
 Mexican Open (tennis), the national tennis tournament held in Acapulco, Mexico
 Mexican Open (badminton)
 Mexican Open (squash)